Firuzkuh County is in Tehran province, Iran. The capital of the county is the city of Firuzkuh. At the 2006 census, the county's population was 37,416 in 10,414 households. The following census in 2011 counted 38,712 people in 11,828 households. At the 2016 census, the county's population was 33,558 in 11,700 households.

Administrative divisions

The population history of Firuzkuh County's administrative divisions over three consecutive censuses is shown in the following table. The latest census shows two districts, five rural districts, and two cities.

References

 

Counties of Tehran Province